SaskTel Centre (formerly Credit Union Centre, and originally Saskatchewan Place; informally also known as Sask Place) is an arena located in the Agriplace Industrial Park, Saskatoon, Saskatchewan, Canada. With 15,195 permanent stadium seats, and situated near the city's northern entrance, the facility opened in February 1988 with a seating capacity of around 7,800. It was expanded to 11,330 for the World Junior Hockey Championships in 1990. Additional permanent seating was added in 2008 and 2009. The current capacity is 15,190 for hockey.

It is the home venue of the Saskatoon Blades of the Western Hockey League, the Saskatchewan Rattlers of the Canadian Elite Basketball League and the Saskatchewan Rush of the National Lacrosse League, with the arena being referred to as Co-op Field at SaskTel Centre during Rush games as per a separate sponsorship with Saskatoon Co-op.

The ashes of Saskatoon-born Detroit Red Wings player Gordie Howe, as well as those of his wife Colleen Howe, are buried at the base of a statue of Howe outside SaskTel Centre's main entrance.

History

SaskPlace was constructed as a replacement for the Saskatoon Arena, a concrete building constructed in Saskatoon's downtown core in the 1930s, and which was in use until 1988, hosting its final hockey game only a week before SaskPlace opened. Nicknamed "The Barn", the facility had outlived its usefulness some 20 years earlier and had become infamous for leaky roofs and substandard amenities, yet Saskatonians were hesitant to lose the landmark and a number of years passed between the 1970s proposal to replace the structure and the eventual demolition of the Arena and the opening of SaskPlace.

In 1982, Bill Hunter, a local sports promoter, attempted to purchase the St. Louis Blues NHL team and bring it to Saskatoon. Part of his plan included building an 18,000-seat arena. Two locations were suggested: the site of a decommissioned power plant downtown, just west of the then-present Saskatoon Arena, and another site east of the city's airport in the North Industrial area. Despite Hunter's best efforts, the NHL rejected his offer and Hunter's plans to relocate an NHL team and build a new arena collapsed.

The site eventually chosen for the arena was initially, and still is, unpopular with most Saskatoon residents. Situated in the remote Agri Place industrial park at the north end of the city, accessible only via highways 11 and 16 and Marquis Drive, SaskPlace was accused of being too inconvenient for seniors and people of limited transportation to access, as opposed to the original downtown arena site which was close to most bus routes. The city's original plan was to relocate Saskatoon's exhibition grounds alongside SaskPlace as well, but this proposal was defeated in a civic plebiscite following public protest over access and safety concerns. At the time of construction, there were very few businesses and services located in the immediate area. As of 2016, the surrounding area has expanded, but the lack of fan amenities that most would find in other cities, such as nearby bars and restaurants, remains. A Motel 6 was the first hotel to be built near the arena, in 2004. A second hotel was constructed in the early 2010s.

Plans to build interchanges on the two major access routes into the facility were announced soon after the arena opened. However, these plans never developed, with the city and province instead opting to install a set of traffic lights at Marquis Drive and Highway 16 only 27 years after the arena's opening. Near-sighted planning on behalf of the city at the time of construction has led to traffic severely backing up after large-scale events in recent years.

In the early 2000s, Saunders Avenue, a street leading into the parking lot of Credit Union Centre, was renamed Bill Hunter Avenue in honour of Bill Hunter, who died in 2002. This was considered ironic by many Saskatonians, given Hunter lobbied for the facility to be built in another location near the old Saskatoon Arena. The city then transferred the 'Saunders' name to a new street in the River Landing redevelopment area—running through the former site of the Saskatoon Arena.

Expansion
In 2008–2009, the arena was renovated for the 2010 World Junior Ice Hockey Championships. There were 2,981 seats added to the upper deck at the west end of the arena increasing the capacity of the arena to more than 15,000.  The cost of the expansion was pegged at $6.7 million.  $2 million was requested as a loan from the city of Saskatoon and $3 million from a provincial grant.  Hockey Canada may have also contributed about $500,000. The expansion also includes extra washrooms and concessions. The expansion also included the addition of 14 more corporate box seats, bringing the total to 44 and enlarged and improved player facilities such as dressing rooms, weight rooms, coach`s room, equipment room, player`s lounge and medical room.

At about this time, there was a proposal from Ice Edge Holdings to purchase the Phoenix Coyotes and begin playing five of the Coyotes' home games each season at Credit Union Centre beginning in December 2009. The logic behind the move, which parallels the Bills Toronto Series in the NFL, was that although Saskatoon was likely too small to support an NHL team of its own, it would easily be able to sell out the Credit Union Centre for one game each month. By May 2011, Ice Edge Holdings had abandoned its plan to purchase the team. Although some members of the Ice Edge group subsequently joined IceArizona, the group that ultimately was successful in purchasing the team, IceArizona did not pursue the earlier proposal to play any home games outside Arizona.

The arena hosted an NHL exhibition game in 2011 when the Edmonton Oilers hosted one of their games there. In 2012, the Winnipeg Jets were scheduled to play an exhibition game, but this was cancelled due to the NHL lockout. They made up for the missed date on September 27, 2013 against the Boston Bruins. The Ottawa Senators and Calgary Flames played on September 16, 2013.

In August 2014, SaskTel acquired the naming rights to the arena, renaming it SaskTel Centre.

Future 
A 2018 study recommended the construction of a new arena and convention centre in the downtown area to replace SaskTel Centre and TCU Place. Both venues were cited as "quickly approaching their end-of-useful life" and not meeting standards in comparison to venues in equivalent markets, specifically citing the arena's "inadequate space and capacity for large event staging and rigging", and poor location and accessibility.

In August 2022, following an evaluation of five potential sites, a report recommending one of two sites—one in the north downtown city yard, and one in the north parking lot of Midtown—was presented to city council.

Major events
The arena's inaugural event was the Saskatoon Blades' first WHL game at the arena, defeating the Brandon Wheat Kings 4–3. Grant Tkachuk scored the first goal in the arena's history.

The Saskatoon Blades have hosted the Memorial Cup twice at SaskTel Centre, first in 1989 (where they lost in the final to the Swift Current Broncos), and again in 2013. As of 2016, they remain the Blades' only two appearances in the Memorial Cup.

During a World Wrestling Federation taping at the arena on October 12, 1992 for a Coliseum Video release, Bret Hart of Calgary (whose father, Stu, was a Saskatoon native) defeated Ric Flair to win his first WWF World Heavyweight Championship. In a match taped for Superstars, Calgary's Bill Jordan was squashed by the debuting Yokozuna, who dethroned Hart the following April at WrestleMania IX. In March 2023, All Elite Wrestling (AEW) announced that it would broadcast its main weekly program Dynamite from SaskTel Centre on July 12, 2023.

In February 2019, it was announced that SaskTel Centre would host the 2021 Canadian Olympic Curling Trials, ahead of the 2022 Winter Olympics.

Concerts 
In June 1988, the area hosted a show by Tiffany.

In 2005, the arena hosted a gala command performance for Queen Elizabeth II and Prince Philip, hosted by Brent Butt, as part of a royal visit to Saskatchewan commemorating the province's centennial.

In 2007, the arena hosted the 2007 Juno Awards. The Juno Awards were to return to SaskTel Centre in 2020, but the ceremony was cancelled on March 12 due to concerns surrounding the coronavirus pandemic.

In October 2014, the arena hosted a show by Demi Lovato of her Demi World Tour.

From June 9–12, 2016, SaskTel Centre hosted six sold-out performances by Garth Brooks and Trisha Yearwood as part of their World Tour. The shows broke a record for concert attendance at the arena (set by Brooks in 1996), with the first featuring 15,458 attendees alone. The six shows had an estimated total of 94,655 attendees.

The single-concert record would be exceeded by Metallica's WorldWired Tour stop at SaskTel Centre in September 2018, attracting 16,874 attendees in one of only two Canadian stops on the tour. The band dedicated their performance of "Nothing Else Matters" to those who had died in the Humboldt Broncos bus crash.

In October 2019, SaskTel Centre hosted a two-night stop on Elton John's Farewell Yellow Brick Road tour.

Attendance records
 The current attendance record for SaskTel Centre is 16,874, which was set on September 15, 2018 for a concert by Metallica.
 The largest crowd for a hockey game at the arena, was 15,171, set on December 31, 2009 for a round robin game of the 2010 World Juniors between Canada and the United States. It was tied on January 5, 2010 for the final of the 2010 World Juniors between Canada and the United States.
 The largest crowd for a Saskatoon Blades game, was 12,588, set on February 9, 2013 in a game against the Lethbridge Hurricanes.
 The largest crowd for a Saskatchewan Rush game, was 15,192 set on May 21, 2016 in a game against the Calgary Roughnecks.

Tenants

Major tournaments and events hosted

Gordie Howe Memorial
A bronze statue of former Detroit Red Wings player and Saskatoon native Gordie Howe has been located outside the arena since 2005. The statue was created by Michael Martin but remained in Eston, Saskatchewan until 1993, when private donations were used to fund its completion. As city property, Saskatoon's city council rejected a proposal to place the statue outside the arena, as they felt it had no artistic value or "enduring quality." The statue, however, would be purchased by the owners of Midtown Plaza, and installed on a street corner near the mall. The placement was criticized by a Saskatoon Star-Phoenix columnist, who felt (as per a survey the paper conducted, and an opinion from Howe himself) that the arena would be a more appropriate location for the statue. In 2005, the Gordie Howe statue was moved outside the arena's main entrance.

Following Howe's death in June 2016, the statue became a memorial site for the player. In September 2016, the cremated remains of Howe and his wife Colleen Howe were buried at the statue's base.

References

External links
 
 Credit Union Centre Hockey League, official website

Indoor arenas in Saskatchewan
Indoor ice hockey venues in Canada
Buildings and structures in Saskatoon
Sports venues in Saskatchewan
Western Hockey League arenas
Indoor lacrosse venues in Canada
Music venues in Saskatchewan
Sport in Saskatoon
1988 establishments in Saskatchewan
Sports venues completed in 1988
Indoor soccer venues
Saskatoon Blades
Saskatchewan Rush